Hunter Fraud Score is a rating score launched locally in India by Experian Credit information company of India (ECICI), to detect fraud in credit applications to banks and insurance companies and help them lower their losses.

Key features 
 Screening data at first level and to identify inconsistencies
 More the data is found, more are the chances of fraud level
 Data sources are used which include intelligence for smart detection
 Prioritising investigations depending upon fraud level.
Closed user group (CUG)

Presently, Experian maintains a network of 112 financial institutions and 21 life insurer companies as a part of the CUG, that covers 70 per cent of the retail banking applications whose data is verified timely. With increase in these numbers, it can become a more complicated and secured database.

Methodology 
There are various criteria based on which information is matched in the loan application from different data sources and inconsistencies after that are identified. The company has some sophisticated analytical solutions which allows it to create an advanced analytical approach, to predict and calculate some authentic score that can help banks lower their losses. A data repository has been created to collect the data of all the past customers in addition to their KYC norms data, on which data mining is performed to filter out the useful minute details and extrapolate the user's data. The solution has some customised rules to analyse different data sources to highlight inconsistencies and discrepancies so that it can match with the known fraud data. The results calculate the level of fraud risk and any application if found suspicious is moved into a special investigation tool to take further action.

Under Section 45 of the Insurance Laws (Amendment) Act, if three years duration is crossed for any reason to reject an insurance claim then it can not be rejected after that period. So, this repository would help them catch criminals before they breach the obstacles to commit fraud. Data from life insurers reveals that there is about 20 per cent rise year by year in fraudulent claims. A nexus has been identified of fraudulent people who get their claims passed through their relatives in the authorities which pass the claims. Depending on the screening, businesses will be able to identify applications that have high probability of potential fraud.

References 

Market research
Year of establishment missing